Harvinder Sahota (born 15 April 1941) is an Indian American cardiologist. He is the inventor of the FDA approved Perfusion Balloon Angioplasty known as "Sahota Perfusion Balloon".

Sahota holds two dozen patents for other medical inventions including Red Laser Light for prevention of Restenosis, Multi-Lobe Balloon, Fibrin coated Stent, Hemostat to stop bleeding from ruptured artery during the procedure. He holds license to promote a drug-coated stent.  He performed the first coronary Angioplasty in many hospitals around the world including India, Mexico, Russia, Ukraine and the United States. He has served as the Vice Chairman and Chairman of Orange County Emergency Medicine Commission in California and Research Director and Advisory Board members of the Metro Hospital Heart Institute in New Delhi, India, and Tbilisi, Republic of Georgia. Currently, he serves on the Board of Directors of Claremont Lincoln University.

Early life and education
Sahota was born on 15 April 1941 to Lachman Singh and Dhan Kaur in Basti Tankawali, near Ferozepur in the Indian state of Punjab, India. He was named Iqbal. Later at the age of five, his name was changed to Harvinder as a result of medical setback he suffered in which he was declared dead. Because he was revived by a physician, the event was considered a second birth requiring a new name.

Sahota attended high schools and colleges in India, majoring in medicine.  After completing an M.B.B.S. from the University of Punjab in 1965, Harvinder did Internship in Punjab Medical College. In 1967, he went to England to do further residency and specialization in medicine. For further specialization he enrolled as a post graduate student at the University of Liverpool where he did his specialization in tropical medicine and pulmonary in Cardiff and London Hammersmith Hospitals.

Career
Sahota came to the United States in 1974. He did his fellowship in cardiology at the University of Rochester in New York.  Then he went to Regina, Saskatchewan, Canada to complete his chief residency. In 1977, he came to St Vincent's hospital in Los Angeles, California to do another fellowship in cardiology.  After completing his second fellowship in cardiology at St. Vincent, he started his practice in cardiology in Los Angeles in 1978.  He holds licenses to practice cardiology in California, New York, the United Kingdom and India.

In 1985, Sahota invented "Sahota Perfusion Balloon" which allows blood to flow to the heart muscle during inflation and prevents chest pain during the operation. After getting the US FDA approval in the 1980s the balloon is now used in angioplasty surgeries all over the world. Sahota went on to invent several others devices, some non-medical, including the one with his son Neil about Identity Theft, especially for credit cards. On 17 January 1990 Sahota performed the first coronary angioplasty in North India and nine more followed in the week that the team spent in Chandigarh.

After the perfusion balloon, Sahota invented Multi-lobe perfusion balloon that straightens the artery on inflation during operation preventing blockages to occur at the bend of the artery. As an inventor, he holds a total of 24 patents and many other medical inventions such as Red Laser Light for prevention of Restenosis, Fibrin coated Stent, Hemostat to stop bleeding from ruptured artery during the procedure.

In 2000, Sahota received the distinguished physician award presented by former Indian Prime Minister I. K. Gujral and was honored by the National Federation of Indian-American Associations in the United States. In 2003, he was appointed commissioner of medicine for Orange County, California, by the Orange County board of supervisors. He has also received the excellence in medicine award from the Global Indian Congress of San Francisco.

In 2012, Sahota was honored by the American Heart Association for his cardiovascular science and medicine research and his significant contribution to interventional cardiology. In the same year, he was also awarded the Golden Orange Award by the World Affairs Council of Orange County.

Awards, honors and recognitions
 American Heart Association Award (2012)
 World Affairs Council - Golden Orange Award (2012)
 Global Indian Congress - Excellence in Medicine Award (2003)
 Distinguished Physician Award - presented by I.K. Gujral, Prime minister of India (2000)
 Plaque of Excellence in Medicine - National Federation of Indian American Association, Dallas (2000)

Publications
 Harvy Sahota, et al., (2000) "Endoluminal Reconstruction of the Arterial Wall with Endothelial Cell/Glue Matrix Reduced Restenosis in an Atherosclerotic Rabbit," Journal of the American College of Cardiology, Vol. 36. No. 4.
 Harvy Sahota, et al., (2000), "Long-term Follow-up after Coronary Stenting and Intravascular Red Laser Therapy," American Journal of Cardiology, Vol. 86 (9): 927–937.
 Vossoughi Jafar, (2000), "Stent Graph Update," Medical & Engineering Publisher Inc. ISN 1-903-636-00-8.

Bibliography

References

External links

Living people
1941 births
People from Firozpur district
Medical doctors from Punjab, India
People from Bellflower, California
Alumni of the University of Liverpool
Alumni of Cardiff University
University of Rochester alumni
University of Saskatchewan alumni
Indian cardiac surgeons
Indian Sikhs
American cardiologists
American people of Indian descent in health professions
Indian philanthropists
American philanthropists
American Sikhs
Panjab University alumni
20th-century Indian medical doctors
20th-century surgeons